Don Fernando Calderón de la Barca y Collantes, 1st Marquis of Reinosa (21 February 1811, in Reinosa, Spain – 9 January 1890, in Madrid, Spain) was a Spanish noble and politician who served as Minister of State between 1875 and 1877.

Second son of Manuel Santiago Calderón de la Barca y Rodríguez-Fontecha, Senator for Cantabria, and his wife Saturnina Collantes y Fonegra. His eldest brother Saturnino Calderón de la Barca y Collantes, also a prominent politician who held important offices.

|-

1811 births
1890 deaths
People from Reinosa
Marquesses of Spain
Conservative Party (Spain) politicians
Foreign ministers of Spain
Justice ministers of Spain
Members of the Congress of Deputies (Spain)
Members of the Senate of Spain
Politicians from Cantabria
Knights of the Golden Fleece of Spain
Presidents of the Supreme Court of Spain